Gustaf Andersson may refer to:

 Gustaf Andersson (footballer, born 1974), Swedish footballer
 Gustaf Andersson (footballer, born 1979), Swedish footballer
 Gustaf Andersson (politician) (1884–1961), Swedish politician
 Gustaf Andersson (speed skater) (1903–1986), Swedish speed skater
 Gustaf Andersson (sport shooter) (1885–1969), Swedish sport shooter